Mozhgan Babamarandi (Persian: مژگان بابامرندی) (born in Tehran, Iran), is an Iranian writer best known for children and young adult fiction.

She began writing for youngsters in 1995, with a concentration on teenagers. Her novels are published by well-known Iranian publishers, and she is a well-known character in Iranian children's and adolescent literature. Her stories are based on her own childhood experiences. Her novels deal with moral and social issues. She prefers the short-story format, which is the most common format in which her works are published in Iran. She is currently residing in Tehran.

She has won and also been nominated for several national awards, including First literary Festival "Kam e Yusef" for her book :'Only Daddy Can Wake Me Up '. She started writing novels for kids, about two decades ago. Her first novel "Statue"  was published in "Keyhan Bacheha; A children's magazine " in 1996. One year later ; in 1997, her second story : "A Gift for Narges", was published by the Office of Islamic Culture Publications.

Educations 
Bachelor: Persian Literature

Master: Dramatic Literature

Awards 
 Institute for the Intellectual Development of Children and Young Adults in Tehran Province, Storytelling Festival Winner, 1998
 First Prize in Stage Design at the Institute for the Intellectual Development of Children and Young Adults' First Puppet Show Festival in the country, 1999, for the play Aunt Cockroach.
 Tehran Province's Top Trainer Institute for the Intellectual Development of Children and Young Adults, 1999
 In 2001, she was named the country's top trainer institute for the intellectual development of children and young adults.
 "Hi Grandpa ", winning first rank in Press Festival (in novel fiction), 2001
 First Prize in Directing at the Institute for the Intellectual Development of Children and Young Adults 4th Puppet Show Festival in Tehran Province, 2002, for the play The Man Had No Lips.
 "I have Missed Sunshine ", winning Tehran Selected Screenplay, 2003
 Winning the Eighth rank of National 88 Words Internet Stories, 2008
 "The Good Ashura Day" Play, selected as the best story of the province (Tehran), 2008
 "Hi Grandpa ",Winning the "Hi Kids Festival ; Salam Bacheha " award, 2009
 "I Will  Become a Spiderman Like Rostam", winning the Sixteenth Festival of Iranian  Institute for the Intellectual Development of Children and Young Adults, 2013
 " Old Aunt Liked to Tell Story ",winning the competition of Cultural-Scientific Publications, 2014
 "May God Turn the Steering Wheel" (the command), nominated for Press Book's Festival, 2016

Published books 
Since 1996, She has written more than 20 story books for Children and Young Adults, which all of them have been published.

Some of them are as follows:

 Statue, Keiyan Bacheha-Iran, 1996
 A Gift For Narges, The Office of Islamic Culture Publications-Iran,1997
 All Stars For You, Madineh Publications-Iran, 2001
 The Golden Fountain pen, Madreseh Publications-Iran, 2001
 Hi Grandpa, Madreseh Publications-Iran, 2008
 My First Word Was Butterfly, Soroush Publications-Iran, 2008
 Even Men Sometimes Cry, Madreseh Publications-Iran, 2008
 Sunshine Crossed Moonlight and Me, Amir Kabir Publications-Iran, 2009
 What Is The Taste Of Secret ?, Cultural-Scientific Publications-Iran, 2009
 Shy Guest, Cultural-Scientific Publications-Iran, 2009
 Only Daddy Can Wake me Up, Iranian Institute for the Intellectual Development of Children and Young Adults, 2009
 Every Year Before The First Bell, Beh Nashr Publications-Iran, 2010
 Let's Paint The Sky, Madreseh Publications-Iran, 2010
 
 Madam Poetess And Mr. Beethoven, Beh Nashr Publications-Iran, 2011
 My Amerindian Name, Soroush Publications-Iran, 2012
 Why Sun Was Crying?, Amir Kabir Publications-Iran, 2012
 Seven Stairs, Soroush Publications-Iran, 2012
 I Will Become A Spiderman Like Rostam, Iranian Institute for the Intellectual Development of Children and Young Adults, 2012
 I Wish There Was Violet Beneath Every Snow, Soroush Publications-Iran, 2015
 The Story Of Current Condition And The Wishes Of A Donkey, Peidayesh Publications-Iran, 2015
 The Tickle's Cocoon Was Close To Grandma, Amir Kabir Publications-Iran, 2016
 The Colour Of Daddy's Laugh, Monadiye Tarbiat Publications-Iran, 2017
 The Yard Was Full Of Bird And Song, Monadiye Tarbiat Publications-Iran, 2017
 In The Name Of God, Raise the Papers,  Monadiye Tarbiat Publications-Iran, 2017
 
 The news presenter was silent, Rowzaneh Publication, 2018

References

External links
 Frankfurt Rights
 Author's profile
 The News Presenter was Silent book

Iranian writers